The 2015 Nebraska Danger season is the fifth season for the Nebraska Danger as a professional indoor football franchise and their fifth in the Indoor Football League (IFL). One of ten teams competing in the IFL for the 2015 season, the Nebraska Danger are members of the Intense Conference. For the fifth consecutive year, the team played their home games under head coach Mike Davis in the Eihusen Arena at the Heartland Events Center in Grand Island, Nebraska.

Regular season

All start times are local time

Standings

Postseason

Roster

References

External links
 Nebraska Danger official website
 Nebraska Danger official statistics
 Nebraska Danger at The Grand Island Independent

Nebraska Danger
Nebraska Danger
Nebraska Danger